Königsdorf is a village in the district of Jennersdorf in the Austrian state of Burgenland. In 2022 the population of the village was 768.

Population

References

Cities and towns in Jennersdorf District
Slovenian communities in Burgenland